The list of ship launches in 1943 includes a chronological list of some of the ships launched in 1943.

January

February

March

April

May

June

July

August

September

October

November

December

Unknown date

References

Sources
 

 

1943
Ship launches